Janaka de Silva FRCP FNASSL is a Sri Lankan physician and academic. He is Professor Emeritus of Medicine at the University of Kelaniya.

Janaka de Silva was educated at Royal College, Colombo and holds degrees from the universities of Colombo and Oxford. He had his higher specialist clinical training at the John Radcliffe Hospital.

De Silva was Professor and Chair of Medicine at the University of Kelaniya from 1996-2022, and in 1997, he succeeded Carlo Fonseka as Dean of Medicine, a post he held for nine years. He was also Director of the Postgraduate Institute of Medicine (PGIM), University of Colombo from 2014-2020, and a member of the University Grants Commission from 2008-2011. Before becoming its Director he chaired a number of boards in the PGIM, where he and colleagues established the first formal training programme for gastroenterologists in Sri Lanka. Together with Kemal Deen and a few others he pioneered setting up of the liver transplant service at the Colombo North Teaching Hospital.

De Silva’s most influential contributions to research stemmed from his abiding interest in health problems prevalent in Sri Lanka. He was Chairman of the National Research Council from 2013-2019. He held several editorial appointments and served on committees in health and research organizations including the WHO, Wellcome Trust and the UK's National Institute for Health and Care Research (NIHR).

He was President of the Ceylon College of Physicians in 2004, twenty years after his father, P. T. de Silva. In addition to awards and fellowships from several academic and professional bodies, de Silva was conferred an honorary DSc by his University, and the national titular honour Vidya Jyothi - Sri Lanka's highest honor for science.

References

Sinhalese academics
Alumni of Royal College, Colombo
Alumni of the University of Colombo
Living people
Fellows of the Royal College of Physicians
Alumni of Pembroke College, Oxford
Academic staff of the University of Kelaniya
Vidya Jyothi
Sinhalese physicians
Year of birth missing (living people)